Evan Frankfort (born December 13, 1970) is an American television music producer.  He has composed music for several shows and films including Rules of Engagement, Swingtown, In Plain Sight, and 90210.  He has also contributed to over 100 records, working with artists including Plain White T's, Liz Phair, Rancid, Flock of Seagulls, The Dollyrots, and many more.

Evan met Liz Phair while both were in the studio working on TV shows, and became one of her scoring partners, on projects such as Swingtown, In Plain Sight and 90210, as well as Phair's album Funstyle. Both alongside Marc 'Doc' Dauer have been scoring In Plain Sight since its third season.

Work 1990 - present
 The 100 (TV series) (2014) - Composer 
 In Plain Sight (2012) - Composer
 Rules of Engagement - Composer 
 State of Georgia (2011) - Composer  
 The Pee-wee Herman Show (2011) - Music producer 
 The Beautiful Life: TBL (2009) - Composer 
 Swingtown (2008) - Composer 
 90210 - Composer
 Les Friction - Louder Than Words (2012) - Vocalist, Composer

Awards
In 1996, Evan won a Daytime Emmy Award for his musical contributions to Guiding Light, under the name Christopher Jay.

References

1970 births
Living people
American male composers
21st-century American composers
Emmy Award winners
21st-century American male musicians